Curtis Lamont Dennis (born January 15, 1988) is an American  professional basketball player from the Bronx, New York. He first attended the University of New Mexico, then transferred to University of Toledo, and finished his collegiate career at Iona College. In high school, he attended St. Raymond High School for Boys, than transferred to Blessed Sacrament-St. Gabriel High School where he graduated in 2006. After graduating he went to Houston Inner City Academy/Gulf Shores Academy in Houston, Texas. After completing a full year there he later transferred to Findlay Prep Academy in Henderson, Nevada. Dennis is currently playing for Tadamon Zouk in Lebanon but has not signed officially.

Prep career

Blessed Sacrament-St. Gabriel (2004–06)
Blessed Sacrament-St. Gabriel High School, located in New Rochelle, New York, is where Dennis played his junior year along with cousin Jarrid Famous. The season was cut short in the playoffs against Salesian High School in the CHSAA B. Dennis averaged 13.0 points per game. His senior year he averaged 18.2 points per game and won the CHSAA B City Championship against Regis High School in Iona College Gymnasium. They followed that with a victory in the state championship game against Nichols High School in Niagara University's gymnasium. He was the most valuable player of both Championships. In The Glen Falls Federation championship, Blessed Sacrament won the first game vs Lackawanna High School but came up short against Global Studies. Blessed Sacrament Varsity Men's Basketball Team of 2005–2006 season was inducted into The New Rochelle Hall of Fame.

Houston Inner City Academy/Gulf Shores Academy (2006–07)
Following Blessed Sacrament-St. Gabriel High School Dennis did a post-graduate year at Gulf Shores Academy in Houston, Texas. He was coached by Ken "Juice" Williams (who coached NBA players Gerald Green and Darington Hobson). Dennis averaged 24.5 points per game and led the Tigers to a 45–3 record. Coach Williams said, "I call him "Captain Curt because of his leadership abilities on and off the court. During the summer he would train unfortunate kids for free because he wanted to give back to the community. That is tremendous for his age." In summer 2007, Dennis played AAU basketball for the Houston Playmakers and Houston Elite. He became a top 25 prospect in the country due to his performances in these leagues.

Findlay Prep (2007–08)
Following a remarkable summer, Dennis was asked to join the Findlay Prep team in Henderson, Nevada, by their coaches. He joined a potent class of future NCAA Division I standouts in Kentucky's DeAndre Liggins, Florida State's Deividas Dulkys, UTEP's Jacques Streeter, California's Jorge Gutierrez, Seattle's Clarence Trent and UNLV's Carlos Lopez and Brice Massamba. Dennis average 13.0 points per game and shot 40% from behind the 3-point line, and help lead the Pilots to a 32–1 record and an appearance in the national prep school championship game versus Hargrave Military Academy, where the Pilots came up short. During his tenure at Findlay Prep he helped the Pilots become ranked #2 in the country, and himself became the 13th highest rated high school player in the country by Rivals.com and Scout.com. He committed and later signed a letter of intent to University of New Mexico coaches Steve Alford and Craig Neal.

College career

University of New Mexico (2008–10)
Coming into the New Mexico, Dennis was part of top 10 recruiting class in the country by ESPN, Scout.com and Rivals.com. This class consisted of Phillip McDonald, Nate Garth, Will Brown, Isaiah Rusher, Curtis Dennis, and AJ Hardeman. They were ranked #9 in the country. His first year at New Mexico he red-shirted with the Lobos until the 2009–10 season. He primarily came off the bench and helped them become ranked as high as #8 in the country at one point. The Lobos won the Mountain West Conference regular season championship and earned an automatic bid into the NCAA tournament. The Lobos knocked off Montana in the first round, but then lost to Washington in the ensuing round. During that season he contributed to 31 games, notable scoring 11 points in 14 minutes versus #10 BYU, led by Jimmer Fredette,  and 14 points in 14 minutes against  No.20 Texas Tech. Dennis' sophomore year he started in three games being scoring 12 points in 23 minutes vs Detroit, and 7 points 3 assists vs Arizona State. He later transferred to University of Toledo to play for Tod Kowalczyk.

University of Toledo (2011–12)
Because he was a mid-year transfer he had to sit out until December, where he made his opening games vs Youngstown State University. Playing for the Toledo Rockets he was the team's second leading scorer, averaging 13.0 points per game. He averaged 27 minutes per game and shot 35% from behind the 3-point line in the non-conference season, and 39% from behind the 3-point line Mid-American Conference (MAC). He made 49 three-pointers during this season, with a career-high five three-pointers in a single game more than once. He scored in double figures in 17 games scoring 20 or more points twice. He was runner-up for Sixth Man of the Year in the MAC, and was 2012 All-MAC Honorable Mention. He was among the leaders in the nation in steals, and scored on 20 percent of Toledo's possessions. Dennis was a big part of the reason the program went from  a 4–28 record consecutively for four years to a 19–17 record in one season 2011–12. They also won their first postseason game in the CollegeInsider.com Postseason Tournament.

Iona College (2012–13)
Due to NCAA sanctions and the rule of allowing seniors not to be held accountable, Dennis was able to transfer to Iona College in the Metro Atlantic Athletic Conference (MAAC). After losing two big players Scott Machado and Mike Glover from Iona's 2012 season it was clear they needed to add a few pieces to relive that run. Head coach Tim Cluess felt Dennis would be a good piece to that equation in joining Lamont Jones and Sean Armand. Dennis helped the Iona Gaels go 20–14 in 2012–13. He helped the team to win the 2013 MAAC tournament championship against Manhattan College to earn a bid in NCAA Tournament. Iona lost to Ohio State in the opening round.

Professional career
In January 2014 Curtis Dennis signed to a Lebanon Basketball Team Tadamon Zouk with cousin Jarrid Famous.

References
 https://web.archive.org/web/20140227053139/http://www.utrockets.com/ViewArticle.dbml?DB_OEM_ID=18000&ATCLID=205134933
 http://www.icgaels.com/ViewArticle.dbml?DB_OEM_ID=14900&ATCLID=205702930
 https://web.archive.org/web/20160304080015/http://varsityinsider.lohudblogs.com/2009/07/10/catching-up-with-curtis-dennis/
 https://web.archive.org/web/20090430183051/http://newmexico.scout.com/2/671292.html
 http://www.maxpreps.com/athlete/curtis-dennis/xLoEE_TnEeKZ5AAmVebBJg/gendersport/basketball-stats.htm#year=04-05
 http://www.maxpreps.com/athlete/curtis-dennis/xLoEE_TnEeKZ5AAmVebBJg/gendersport/basketball-stats.htm#year=05-06
 http://www.nydailynews.com/archives/sports/mount-wins-title-ot-thriller-article-1.604419
 http://www.maxpreps.com/athlete/curtis-dennis/64Z55PTqEeKZ5AAmVebBJg/gendersport/basketball-stats.htm#year=07-08
 http://newmexico.scout.com/a.z?s=203&p=8&c=1&nid=3322285
 http://newmexico.scout.com/a.z?s=203&p=8&c=1&nid=3090690
 http://scouthoops.scout.com/a.z?s=75&p=3&c=2008Top20PostGrads
 http://www.covers.com/pageLoader/pageLoader.aspx?page=/data/ncb/results/2012-2013/recap846050.html
 https://web.archive.org/web/20140203123836/http://lebanesebasketball.net/curtis-dennis-in-tadamon-zouk/

1988 births
Living people
American expatriate basketball people in Lebanon
Basketball players from New York City
Findlay Prep alumni
Iona Gaels men's basketball players
New Mexico Lobos men's basketball players
Shooting guards
Small forwards
Sportspeople from the Bronx
Toledo Rockets men's basketball players
American men's basketball players